John Michael Papit (July 25, 1928 – April 6, 2015) was an American football halfback in the National Football League for the Washington Redskins and the Green Bay Packers.  He played college football at the University of Virginia and was drafted in the seventh round of the 1951 NFL Draft. He died after a stroke in 2015.

References

External links
Just Sports Stats

1928 births
2015 deaths
American football halfbacks
Green Bay Packers players
Players of American football from Philadelphia
Virginia Cavaliers football players
Washington Redskins players